A national bibliography is a systematic bibliography of acquisitions of a national library. Most countries either have a national bibliography or are in the process of compiling one. Some countries that do not have a national bibliography of their own participate in larger, such as the Arab Bulletin of Publications, the CARICOM Bibliography, Bibliografía Actual del Caribe, Boletin Bibliografico, or the South Pacific Bibliography.

Current national bibliographies

Notes

See also
 National Bibliography Number
 Universal Short Title Catalogue

References

Further reading

External links
 National Bibliographic Register at International Federation of Library Associations and Institutions (IFLA)

Bibliography
National libraries